Simon Dutton (born 1 January 1958) is an English actor, best known for playing the title role of Simon Templar (alias the Saint) in a series of internationally produced television films in 1989. In 2007, he joined the cast of British sitcom Not Going Out as recurring character Guy, but was written out at the end of series two.

Dutton has been married two times, to Betsy Brantley and Tamsin Olivier. Both marriages resulted in divorce.

Filmography

Film

Television

References

External links
 

English male film actors
English male television actors
Living people
1958 births